Prince of Zhao or King of Zhao may refer to:

Zhou dynasty
King Wuling of Zhao (325 BC – 299 BC), first ruler of Zhao state declared King
King Huiwen of Zhao (299 BC – 266 BC), inherited throne after abdication of King Wuling of Zhao

Han dynasty

Zhao Xie (205 BC – 203 BC), descendant of Zhao state who was captured and executed in Battle of Jingxing
Zhang Er (張耳; 203 BC – 202 BC), created as Prince of Zhao for assisting Han Xin in Battle of Jingxing
Zhang Ao (202 BC – 198 BC), son-in-law of Emperor Gaozu of Han who was falsely accused of conspiring rebellion
Liu Ruyi (198 BC – 194 BC), fourth son of Emperor Gaozu of Han, killed by Empress Dowager Lü
Liu You (194 BC – 181 BC), sixth son of Emperor Gaozu of Han, starved to death in prison
Liu Hui (181 BC), fifth son of Emperor Gaozu of Han, committed suicide
Lü Lu (181 BC – 180 BC), nephew of Empress Dowager Lü created as prince during the Lü Clan Disturbance
Liu Sui (180 BC – 154 BC), son of Liu You and one of the seven princes in the Rebellion of the Seven States

Tang dynasty
Li Fu (639–660), thirteenth son of Emperor Taizong of Tang

Ming dynasty

Zhu Qi (1370–1371), ninth son of Hongwu Emperor
Zhu Gaosui, third son of Yongle Emperor, the 1st Prince of Zhao

See also
Zhao (state)